This is a list of the complete operas of the French composer Pierre-Alexandre Monsigny (1729–1817). The majority of Monsigny's operas were premiered by the Opéra-Comique, first at the Parisian fairs of Saint-Germain and Saint-Laurent, and later (after the company merged with, and became known as, the Comédie-Italienne) at the Hôtel de Bourgogne in Paris. The company also premiered several of his later operas at the Théâtre de la Cour at the Palace of Fontainebleau before presenting them at the Bourgogne. L'îsle sonnante was premiered by the company at the residence of Madame de Montesson in Villers-Cotterêts before it was given at the Bourgogne.

List

References
Notes

Sources
 Noiray, Michel (1992), "Monsigny [Moncigny, Moncini, Monsigni], Pierre-Alexandre" in The New Grove Dictionary of Opera, ed. Stanley Sadie, vol. 3, pp. 438–440. London: Macmillan. 
 Pitou, Spire (1983). The Paris Opéra: An Encyclopedia of Operas, Ballets, Composers, and Performers. Genesis and Glory, 1671–1715. Westport, Connecticut: Greenwood Press. .
 Pitou, Spire (1985). The Paris Opera: An Encyclopedia of Operas, Ballets, Composers, and Performers. Rococo and Romantic, 1715-1815. Westport, Connecticut: Greenwood Press. .
 Wild, Nicole; Charlton, David (2005). Théâtre de l'Opéra-Comique Paris: répertoire 1762-1972. Sprimont, Belgium: Editions Mardaga. .

 
Lists of operas by composer
Lists of compositions by composer